{{Infobox NFL season
| logo =
| team = New York Giants
| year = 2011
| record = 9–7
| division_place= 1st NFC East
| coach = Tom Coughlin
| general manager = Jerry Reese
| owner = John MaraSteve Tisch
| stadium = MetLife Stadium
| training camp = New York Giants logo.svg
| playoffs = Won Wild Card Playoffs (vs. Falcons) 24–2Won Divisional Playoffs (at Packers) 37–20 Won  NFC Championship (at 49ers) 20–17  Won Super Bowl XLVI (vs. Patriots) 21–17| pro bowlers = Selected but did not participate due to participation in Super Bowl XLVI:QB Eli ManningDE Jason Pierre-Paul
| AP All-pros = Jason Pierre-Paul, DE – 1st Team
Victor Cruz, WR – 2nd Team
| uniform = 
| colors = Blue, red, white, gray
   | next = 2012
| shortnavlink = Giants seasons
}}

The 2011 New York Giants season' was the 87th season for the team in the National Football League (NFL). They played all of their home games at MetLife Stadium in East Rutherford, New Jersey. Although the team failed to improve on their 10–6 mark from 2010, the Giants were able to qualify for the playoffs, and in another Cinderella run that paralleled what they did in 2007, they won Super Bowl XLVI, their fourth Super Bowl win in franchise history.

Many analysts predicted a rough year for the Giants. Despite highs and lows throughout the season, the Giants, with a 9–7 record, returned to the NFL playoffs for the first time since 2008, winning the NFC East and finished the season as the NFC's #4 seed. New York finished 10–6 in 2010 but failed to qualify for the playoffs due to not having any tiebreakers over any NFC playoff team. The Giants entered their week 17 match up with the Cowboys with both teams tied for the division lead with 8–7 records.  The Giants took a 21–0 first half lead and while the Cowboys closed the gap to make the score 21–14 early in the 4th quarter, the Giants held on to defeat the Cowboys 31–14, clinching the divisional title and a playoff berth.

In the playoffs, the Giants defeated the Atlanta Falcons, Green Bay Packers, and the San Francisco 49ers to win the NFC championship. The Giants defeated the New England Patriots in Super Bowl XLVI, which was a rematch of Super Bowl XLII from 4 years earlier in which the Giants defeated the previously undefeated Patriots. As in 2007, 1990, and 1986, the Giants played their eventual Super Bowl opponent during the regular season. The Giants also played the Packers and 49ers during the season, losing both games in the final minutes of play.

The 2011 Giants were the first team in NFL history to reach the Super Bowl with a negative point differential (minus-6, 394 points scored, 400 points allowed). With a 9–7 record, the Giants became the third NFL team to win fewer than 10 games in a 16-game season, and reach the Super Bowl. but became the first of the three to win the Super Bowl. The previous teams to go 9–7 and reach the Super Bowl (the 1979 Rams, who only needed two playoff wins were the first, and the 2008 Arizona Cardinals) were both defeated by the Pittsburgh Steelers. Additionally, upon defeating the Patriots in Super Bowl XLVI the Giants became the first NFC East Division champion to win the Super Bowl since the Dallas Cowboys in 1995 (the Giants were a Wild Card team when they won Super Bowl XLII). The Giants were also close to rematching the Baltimore Ravens in the Super Bowl for the first time since 2000.

The 2011 Giants were an aberration from other great Giants teams of the past who were built around tough, physical defensive play and an offense built around a power running attack. Despite Jason Pierre-Paul having a breakout Pro Bowl season with 16.5 sacks, the defense was ranked in the bottom 10 in points and yards allowed and was top 10 in penalties. Their normally durable rushing attack of Brandon Jacobs and Ahmad Bradshaw was ranked last in the NFL with 89 rushing yards per game as a team. The standout of the year was the quarterback play of Eli Manning who threw a career-high and franchise record 4,933 passing yards with 29 touchdown passes. Manning, who was criticized for throwing 25 interceptions in 2010 and considering himself an "elite quarterback" in a class that included his brother and Tom Brady, engineered 6 regular season game-winning drives in 2011 and threw 15 touchdown passes in the 4th quarter, NFL records that still stand. He had 2 more game-winning drives in the playoffs, the NFC Championship and Super Bowl XLVI. Manning's 5 career game-winning drives in the playoffs are tied for third in NFL history with Joe Montana and became the fifth player to win multiple Super Bowl MVP awards. Manning's play subsequently led to the breakout of undrafted wide receiver Victor Cruz and the emergence of Cruz and Hakeem Nicks as the best wide receiver duo in the NFL. Cruz set a franchise record 1,536 receiving yards from 82 receptions, while Nicks had 76 receptions for 1,192 yards.

Some news organizations, among them The St. Louis Post-Dispatch'', said that the Giants' victory in the Super Bowl made them the NFL's version of the 2011 World Series champion St. Louis Cardinals, saying that these two championship teams had been given the last rites by many near the end of the season, but emerged as champions at the end.

This season was the last time the Giants qualified for the playoffs under Coughlin, and would not reach the playoffs again until the 2016 season and would not win a playoff game until the 2022 season. To date, 2011 is the last time the Giants have won the NFC East.

Offseason

Draft Class

Todd McShay (ESPN), Steve Wyche (NFL.com), Pat Kirwan of NFL.com, New Era Scouting, and DraftKing.com predicted that the Giants would use their first round pick (19th overall) to draft Gabe Carimi (who went 29th overall), a left tackle for the Wisconsin Badgers who won the 2010 Outland Trophy as the nation's top collegiate interior lineman, and was a Consensus All-American.  Charles Davis of NFL.com predicted that they would draft Mike Pouncey (who went 15th overall), a center/offensive guard from the University of Florida.  They instead drafted Prince Amukamara, an all-American cornerback from the University of Nebraska.

 The Giants traded its fifth-round selection (#150 overall) and a 2012 conditional draft selection to the Minnesota Vikings in exchange for RB Darius Reynaud and QB Sage Rosenfels.
 Compensatory selection.

Players

Movement
In the first week of the offseason the Giants signed some road free agents and former members of their 2010 practice squad to reserve/future contracts in order to bolster the roster for the 2011 season. In early March the team signed potential free agents to contract extensions: on March 2 the team signed running back D.J. Ware to a two-year extension and on March 3 they signed wide receivers Domenik Hixon and Darius Reynaud to one and two-year extensions, respectively. They also offered tenders to some of their restricted free agents but the effectiveness of these tenders rely on the ongoing CBA talks.

Free agents

Roster

Staff

Staff changes
On March 9, 2011 the assistant special teams Thomas McGaughey accepted a job at LSU as special teams/defensive line coach of their football team. He had been with the Giants since 2007.
On June 24, 2011 it was reported that Larry Izzo would become the Giants' new assistant special teams coach once the NFL Lockout had ceased.

Schedule

Preseason

The Giants' preseason schedule was announced on April 12, 2011.

§ – Due to Hurricane Irene, the Week 3 preseason game against the Jets was moved up to 2:00 p.m. from the originally scheduled time of 7:00 p.m. (EDT). Then, later in the evening of August 26, the game was rescheduled to Monday, August 29 at 7:00 pm. EDT

Regular season

Standings

Regular season results

Week 1: at Washington Redskins

The Giants opened the 2011 season where they had finished the 2010 season, on the road at FedExField against their division rival Washington Redskins to mark the tenth anniversary of September 11, 2001; both teams' cities were attacked by the terrorists that day.

New York had not lost to Washington in the regular season in their last six meetings, but fell in this meeting 28–14. After scoring two first-quarter touchdowns and taking a 14–7 lead, the Giants failed to score again. A Ryan Kerrigan interception return in the third quarter put the Redskins in front and a defensive stop gave the Redskins the ball back. They added an insurance score in the fourth quarter when Rex Grossman found Jabar Gaffney in the end zone and iced the game. Grossman threw for 305 yards and two touchdowns, while Eli Manning threw for 268 with the one interception.

Week 2: vs. St. Louis Rams

The Giants' home opener was played on Monday night and they took a 28–16 victory over the NFC West runners-up from the previous year. The Rams, coached by former Giants defensive coordinator Steve Spagnuolo, took an early lead on a Josh Brown field goal, but that would be their only lead as Eli Manning hit Hakeem Nicks and Domenik Hixon for touchdowns. A Michael Boley fumble return added to that and gave New York a 21–6 lead at the half. St. Louis' only touchdown came in the third quarter as Bradford found Alexander to cut the Giants' lead to 28–16, where the game finished. Manning finished with 200 yards passing and threw his first two touchdown passes of the season while Bradford threw for 331 and one score. After the game, it was announced that Hixon would be lost for the year with a torn ACL.

Week 3: at Philadelphia Eagles

Taking to the road to face another divisional rival, the Giants took care of the Eagles in Philadelphia for the first time since 2008 after having lost the previous five meetings. It was the teams' first meeting since the infamous finish to their second matchup in 2010 which saw DeSean Jackson return a punt for a touchdown as time expired. Giants receiver Victor Cruz had a breakout game with 3 receptions for 110 yards and 2 touchdowns. Manning threw for 254 yards and four touchdowns. Jason Pierre-Paul added two sacks and Ahmad Bradshaw ran for 86 yards. Michael Vick threw for 176 yards and an interception and was knocked out of the game.

Week 4: at Arizona Cardinals

After trailing the Cardinals for most of the game, the Giants scored two touchdowns in the final 100 seconds of the game for their second comeback victory in as many games. Arizona led 20–10 entering the fourth on the strength of two Beanie Wells rushing touchdowns and two Jay Feely field goals. The Giants were aided by a controversial play on their final drive when Victor Cruz appeared to fumble the ball without being tackled. However, upon review it was determined that he had willfully given himself up before he fumbled and as such, he was considered to be down. On the next play Eli Manning snapped the ball before the Cardinals defense was set and threw the game-winning touchdown pass to Hakeem Nicks. Kolb drove the Cardinals into field goal range on their final drive, but a sack by Osi Umenyiora and pass breakup by Corey Webster sealed the win for the Giants. Wells rushed for 138 and three scores while Larry Fitzgerald caught eight of Kevin Kolb's passes for 102 yards. Manning finished 27-40 with 321 passing yards and 2 touchdowns, both in the 4th quarter. Nicks finished with 10 grabs for 162 yards and a touchdown.

Week 5: vs. Seattle Seahawks

The Giants could not contain their momentum from the previous week's comeback and lost a mistaken-laden game to the Seahawks. Cruz had a play-of-the-year candidate touchdown catch in the third quarter as he caught the ball off his own deflection and ran it 68 yards to give the Giants a 22–19 lead in the fourth. Marshawn Lynch led all rushers with 98 yards and a touchdown while Cruz recorded 161 receiving yards. Seahawks wide receiver Doug Baldwin responded with a go-ahead touchdown of his own, to give his team a 29-25 lead. While the Giants were in the red zone to win the game, Victor Cruz slipped on a pass from Manning, and the pass was intercepted by Brandon Browner, who returned it for a Seahawks touchdown, ending the game. Seahawks backup QB Charlie Whitehurst finished the game for an injured Tarvaris Jackson, who finished 15 for 22 for 166 yards. Baldwin and Victor Cruz tied for the game lead with receptions with eight and both recorded a touchdown. Despite Manning throwing three touchdowns and for over 400 yards, his three interceptions proved costly.

Week 6: vs. Buffalo Bills

The Buffalo Bills surprised the NFL world when they opened up to a 4–1 record coming into this game compared to the Giants' 3–2 record. The Giants bounced back from their loss to the Seahawks last week at Metlife Stadium by recording another last-minute win, beating the Bills 27–24 on a Lawrence Tynes field goal. Buffalo took an early 14–7 lead on two big offensive plays, an 80-yard run by Fred Jackson and a 60-yard pass from Ryan Fitzpatrick to Naaman Roosevelt. Ahmad Bradshaw recorded three one-yard touchdown runs and recorded his first 100-yard game of the year while Jackson rushed for 121. Hakeem Nicks led all receivers in yards with 96 and Eli Manning threw for 292 yards with no touchdowns. Fitzpatrick recorded two passing touchdowns but also threw two interceptions.

Week 8: vs. Miami Dolphins

The Giants again found themselves trailing the winless Dolphins entering the fourth quarter. New York was down 17–10 behind two rushing touchdowns, one by wildcat quarterback Steve Slaton and the other by starter Matt Moore, and a Dan Carpenter field goal. Lawrence Tynes recorded a field goal of his own while Eli Manning threw a touchdown to Mario Manningham in the second quarter. After Tynes recorded his second field goal in the fourth, Manning found Victor Cruz for a 25-yard touchdown with 2:30 left to give the Giants the victory. Cruz recorded 99 yards on seven receptions while Manning threw for 349 yards and two touchdowns. Reggie Bush led all runners with 103 yards and Moore threw for 138 and an interception.

Week 9: at New England Patriots

In the rematch of Super Bowl XLII and Super Bowl XLVI preview, Tom Brady was picked off two times in this game. With the ball at the New York 29, Brady's pass was tipped by Michael Boley and intercepted by Mathias Kiwanuka, who returned it to the Giants 28, for Brady's 2nd pick of the game. However, the next possession had the Patriots drive down to the Giants 12. Stephen Gostowski's 27-yard field goal went slight left, making this the first time the Patriots had no score at halftime since December 10, 2006. In this game, turnovers marred both teams. First, Lawrence Tynes kicked a 22-yard field goal that put them on 3–0. Then Brandon Jacobs ran it in 10 yards to put the Giants up 10–0. After that, Aaron Ross muffed the punt, giving the Patriots the ball at the Giants 33. However, they could only muster a 32-yard field goal. Devin Thomas muffed his punt, but scooped it up. Then, Julian Edelman fumbled the punt in Giants territory. Driving in the red zone, Manning got picked off by Kyle Arrington in the end zone. Seven plays later, Brady hit Aaron Hernandez for a 5-yard touchdown, tying the game at 10 just 32 seconds into the fourth quarter. With 7:08, Gostkowski's 45-yard field goal gave the Pats their first lead of the game, 13–10. Manning then led the Giants on an 85-yard march to a 10-yard touchdown pass to Mario Manningham with 3:03 remaining, putting the Giants on top 17–13. It looked like the Pats would win with a comeback of their own when Tom Brady threw a 14-yard pass to Rob Gronkowski, making it 20–17 with 1:36 to go. However, leading the New York Giants 80 yards in just over a minute, Manning hit Jake Ballard for a 1-yard touchdown with 15 seconds left for a 24–20 win on Sunday, repeating a come-from-behind victory similar to the 2008 title game between the teams. They were helped by a 20-yard pass interference penalty against safety Sergio Brown of the Patriots (5–3) that put the ball at the 1 with 30 seconds left. The Giants shocked the NFL and opened up to a 6–2 record. Eli Manning was praised by critics for his recent comeback victories. This was the first time the Patriots lost at home with Tom Brady as their quarterback in 31 regular season starts, and it was also the first Patriots loss at home where they had a 4th quarter lead in the Tom Brady era.

Week 10: at San Francisco 49ers

The Giants' winning streak came to an end in San Francisco but they once again had the game in doubt into the final minutes. Field goals comprised the first half scoring, with Lawrence Tynes hitting two and the 49ers' David Akers recording three. The Giants took their only lead in the third quarter as Eli Manning found Mario Manningham for 13 yards to complete an 84-yard drive. The 49ers recorded two touchdowns on a pass to Vernon Davis and a run by Kendall Hunter, while Manning hit Hakeem Nicks for a 32-yard touchdown late in the game. New York received the ball late in the game and drove inside the 49ers' red zone, but Manning's last pass was deflected at the line of scrimmage to preserve the San Francisco win. Manning threw for 311 yards and two touchdowns but also recorded two interceptions, while Alex Smith threw for 242 and the touchdown pass to Davis. Brandon Jacobs rushed for 55 yards to lead the runners while Victor Cruz's 84 yards was tops for the receivers.

Week 11: vs. Philadelphia Eagles

Playing on Sunday night for the first time all season, the Giants could not take advantage of three Vince Young interceptions and fumbled on their final drive, allowing the Eagles to salvage a split in the season series. New York fell behind 10–0 on an Alex Henery field goal and a touchdown pass from Young to former Giant Steve Smith. Trailing 10–3 entering the fourth, Eli Manning sought out Victor Cruz who caught a pass for 24 yards and the tying touchdown. However, they allowed Young to put together an 18-play drive finishing with a Riley Cooper touchdown pass. The Giants got the ball and Manning completed a pass to Cruz for 47 yards. The next play, Manning was stripped of the ball, sealing the Eagles victory. Despite his three interceptions Young threw for 258 yards in his relief effort for the injured Michael Vick. Manning threw for 264 yards, 128 of which went to Cruz. LeSean McCoy again rushed for 100 yards, recording 113 on 23 carries.

Week 12: at New Orleans Saints

The week 12 Monday night matchup with the Saints in New Orleans was perhaps the lowest point of the Giants' season. New York fell behind 21–3 at halftime and New Orleans cruised to a huge victory. Eli Manning threw for 406 yards and two touchdowns, both to Victor Cruz, but by that time the game had long been decided. Drew Brees recorded 363 yards and 4 touchdowns, two of which were recorded by Jimmy Graham, and rookie halfback Mark Ingram II picked up 80 yards on the ground and scored the game's final touchdown on a 35-yard run. The 49 points were the Giants' most given up to that point in the season.

Week 13: vs. Green Bay Packers

Looking to snap their losing streak, the Giants took on the undefeated Super Bowl champion Packers at home following their blowout loss in New Orleans. New York rebounded from their poor offensive effort against the Saints by putting up 35 points on the defending Super Bowl Champions and had the lead three separate times during the course of the game. With 58 seconds remaining in the game and Green Bay leading 35–27, the Giants tied the game on a touchdown and two-point conversion by Eli Manning, Hakeem Nicks, and DJ Ware. The Giants could not stop Aaron Rodgers from leading the Packers back down the field, however, and Mason Crosby's field goal as time expired kept the hopes for an undefeated season in Green Bay alive for the moment. Manning threw three touchdown passes, with Nicks recording two and backup tight end Travis Beckum the other, and recorded 347 yards passing while Victor Cruz added 119 yards on seven catches. Rodgers recorded 369 yards and four touchdowns, two of which went to Donald Driver.

Week 14: at Dallas Cowboys

The Giants went to Arlington, Texas for their first meeting with the division rival Cowboys. Once again, the Giants were able to record a victory in the final minutes. Trailing late in the fourth quarter, Eli Manning recorded a touchdown pass to tight end Jake Ballard to pull the team within five. After Tony Romo failed to hit Miles Austin on a third down and short on the Cowboys' next drive, the Giants drove down the field in 1:26 and Brandon Jacobs scored to give the Giants a 35–34 lead, extended to 37–34 when DJ Ware converted the two-point play. Dallas drove down the field and got into position for a Dan Bailey field goal that would have tied the game. Just before he kicked the ball, however, Giants coach Tom Coughlin called timeout, negating Bailey's successful kick. On the retry, Jason Pierre-Paul recorded a block field goal by tipping the kick as it was coming up, securing the win and finishing what was a huge night for the second-year defensive end; Pierre-Paul recorded two sacks and a safety as well. NBC color analyst Cris Collinsworth praised Eli Manning for generating yet another fourth quarter comeback. Manning threw for 400 yards and two touchdowns while Romo recorded 321 yards and four scores. Laurent Robinson caught one of those passes as part of his four-catch, 137-yard day while Hakeem Nicks recorded 154 yards on seven catches. Jacobs scored two rushing touchdowns, while recording his first 100-yard rushing game of the season. This game was ranked #2 on NFL.com's Top 20 Games of 2011, the highest regular season game on the list.

Week 15: vs. Washington Redskins

The Giants failed to capitalize on their win from the week before and once again were defeated by the Redskins for the season sweep. Washington never trailed in this game and forced Eli Manning into three interceptions. Although the Giants recorded two off of Rex Grossman, they never were able to get into any sort of offensive groove and lost 23–10. Washington led 17–3 at halftime and never looked back. Grossman threw for 185 yards and a touchdown to Santana Moss. Jabar Gaffney led the Redskins with 85 yards receiving while Hakeem Nicks recorded 73 for the Giants. Manning finished with 257 yards.

This was the last time the Giants were swept by Washington until 2021.

Week 16: at New York Jets

This matchup on Christmas Eve against the crosstown rival New York Jets was considered the most important ever. Both teams needed to win their last two games to make the playoffs and Jets coach Rex Ryan, while trying to motivate his players, added fuel to the fire. He publicly claimed the Jets were the better New York team, saying he didn't get hired to be anybody's "little brother." He went on and covered the Giants three Super Bowl logos in the locker room hallway leading up to the game and sent former Giants Super Bowl hero and current Jet Plaxico Burress as the only captain for the coin toss. The Jets scored a touchdown on their opening drive on a Mark Sanchez touchdown pass to fullback Josh Baker, aided by the Giants having 12 men on the field on a 4th down earlier in the drive. Trailing 7–3 in the second quarter and facing 3rd & 10 from their own 1-yard line, Eli Manning threw a short out pass to Victor Cruz. Cruz broke two tackles and then took off for the end zone, outrunning the remaining Jet defenders on his way to a record-tying 99-yard touchdown reception and a 10–7 lead which the Giants never looked back from. Ahmad Bradshaw had a punishing touchdown run near the end of the third quarter. Down 20-14 and with an opportunity to march down the field to take the lead, Chris Canty forced an intentional grounding penalty in the endzone on Sanchez resulting in a safety. Bradshaw had a 19-yard touchdown run on the next play to seal the 29-14 victory and set up a winner-take-all season finale against the Cowboys. Manning recorded 225 yards and a touchdown, while Cruz's three receptions garnered him 164 of those. Sanchez threw a career-high 59 passes for 258 yards and two total touchdowns but was intercepted twice and Dustin Keller led all receivers with eight receptions.

Week 17: vs. Dallas Cowboys

With the NFC East title on the line the Giants-Cowboys game was moved to Sunday night, marking the first time in the history of prime-time television that both meetings between division rivals were played on the showcase game of the week. The Giants finished off the Cowboys to record the season sweep and win the division. This time, the Giants got out to a 21–0 halftime advantage on a 74-yard hookup from Eli Manning to Victor Cruz and two touchdowns from Ahmad Bradshaw. The Cowboys rallied to within a touchdown when Tony Romo found Laurent Robinson for a second time in the game, but the Giants put the game away with clutch 4th quarter play from Manning and put the nail in the coffin with a 4-yard touchdown pass to Hakeem Nicks, his fifteenth 4th quarter pass of the season, an NFL record. Manning finished with 346 yards and three touchdowns, finishing with a career-high 4,933 passing yards and 29 touchdown passes. Cruz again had a huge game with 178 receiving yards and a touchdown, finishing with 1,536 yards, a franchise record, and nine touchdowns.

Playoffs

Schedule

NFC Wild Card Game: vs. #5 Atlanta Falcons

NFC Divisional Game: at #1 Green Bay Packers

NFC Championship Game: at #2 San Francisco 49ers

Super Bowl XLVI: vs. New England Patriots

In winning the Super Bowl, the Giants became the first team to have won Super Bowl games broadcast on all four U.S. national networks (CBS, ABC, Fox, and now NBC), as well as the first team to win Super Bowls in four different decades. The Giants-Patriots game was the 11th time that there was a rematch in a Super Bowl. In doing so, the 2011 Giants became the first team with fewer than 10 wins (9 wins – 7 losses) in the regular season to win a Super Bowl. Furthermore, Super Bowl XLVI marked just the second time in Super Bowl history that opening score of the title game occurred with a safety when Justin Tuck pressured Tom Brady, and he was called for intentional grounding; the first instance was Super Bowl IX, when Pittsburgh registered a safety on Hall of Fame coach Bud Grant's Vikings. Eli Manning won his second Super Bowl MVP award in four years after orchestrating another game-winning touchdown drive in the game's final moments.

Season facts 
 This is the fourth time that the Giants played a team that they would later play in the Super Bowl. The Giants are 2–2 in regular season and 4–0 in the Super Bowl in these games.
The Giants' overall Super Bowl record is 4-1.
 The Giants are 5–0 in NFC Championship Games.
 The Giants scoring defense was the lowest of Super Bowl winners, ranking 25th after allowing an average of 25 points per game.
 Also notable is that the Giants' rushing offense was ranked 32nd (dead last) in the NFL with 1,427 yards, or an average of 89.2 rushing yards per game.
 The Giants finished the regular season with a -6-point differential (394 scored, 400 allowed), the worst differential of any Super Bowl champion.
 With a 9-7 regular-season record, the 2011 Giants were the first, and are the only, sub-10-win team to win the Super Bowl. They are the third 9-7 team to compete in the Super Bowl, with the 1979 Los Angeles Rams and 2008 Arizona Cardinals both falling to the Pittsburgh Steelers in Super Bowls XIV and XLIII.
 The 2011 New York Giants won their first playoff game at home since the 2000 NFC Championship  against the Minnesota Vikings during the Wild Card game.
 The 2011 Giants were the first team to win the Super Bowl as the NFC's 4th Seed, with the second being the 2021 Los Angeles Rams. The 2008 Cardinals and 1979 Rams were also 4th seeds when they went to the Super Bowl, but lost.
 When the Giants played the New England Patriots in Super Bowl XLVI, the Patriots were 13-3. The Giants also beat them in Foxborough.

References

New York Giants
NFC East championship seasons
National Football Conference championship seasons
New York Giants seasons
Super Bowl champion seasons
New York Giants season
21st century in East Rutherford, New Jersey
Meadowlands Sports Complex